Free Motherland (Azat Hayrenik kusaktsutyun) abbreviated as ԱՀԿ or AHK is a political party in Artsakh. The party was formed on 29 January 2005. Initially, the party consisted of four co-presidents: Arayik Harutyunyan, Arthur Tovmasyan, Rudik Hyusnunts and Arpat Avanesyan.

History
The party was founded on 29 January 2005. The chairman of the party is former Prime Minister Araik Harutyunyan. The party participated in the 2005 Nagorno-Karabakh parliamentary election, after which the party received 10 out of 33 seats in the National Assembly.

Following the 2010 Nagorno-Karabakh parliamentary election, the party won 14 seats in the National Assembly, both in direct and proportional electoral systems. The head of the faction was Gagik Petrosyan.

Following the 2015 Nagorno-Karabakh parliamentary election, the Free Motherland Party won 47.3% of the vote and together with those elected by the majority system, received 15 seats and made up a parliamentary majority. The head of the faction is Arthur Tovmasyan.

The party participated in 2020 Artsakhian general election as part of the Free Motherland - UCA Alliance, which won 16 seats out of 33 in the National Assembly.

Electoral record

Program
The program of the party is a document expressing the national interests of the Artsakh people, their freedom, security and the right to self-determination. The party is a political association of the NKR on a voluntary basis. Objectives include:
a) together with like-minded people to improve social justice,
b) to revive the people's faith in their own strengths and a brighter future,
c) create conditions for the formation of the middle class,
d) promote the spiritual revival of the people and increase the role of the Armenian Apostolic Church.

Ideology
The party maintains a centre-right ideology. The party advocates for a national and religious identity, economic development, preservation of language, educational system reform, and supports cultural patriotism and military spirit. The main difference from other Armenian and Artsakh parties is the support of economic development over democratic transformations. The party believes that economic development will help to achieve Artsakh's independence, while strengthening the establishment of civil society and democracy.

Central Council
Important decisions of the party are made up by a Central Council consisting of 55 persons, by either open or closed voting: 
	
      Harutyunyan Araik
 	Petrosyan Gagik
 	Tovmasyan Arthur
 	Avanesyan Arpat
 	Hyusnunts Rudik
 	Jivanyan Hovik
 	Dadayan Romela
 	Kasparyan Grigory
 	Harutyunyan Valery
 	Petrosyan Karlen
 	Esayan Samvel
 	Adamyan Karen
 	Azatyan Kamo
 	Alibabyan Gennady
 	Alaverdyan Hamlet
 	Aghajanyan Anaida
 	Aghajanyan Samvel
 	Virabyan Samvel
 	Arustamyan Arto
 	Arushanyan Vigen
 	Asryan Murad
 	Asryan Asya
 	Avanesyan Ivan
 	Beglaryan David
 	Beglaryan Erik
 	Gasparyan Grigory
 	Grigoryan Aram
 	Grigoryan Garry
 	Grigoryan Oleg
 	Dadasyan Arthur
 	Israelyan Rudolf
 	Israelyan Ruslan
 	Galstyan Armo
 	Khachatryan Qajik
 	Tsaturyan Armen
 	Hayrapetyan Aleksey
 	Nasibyan Hrachik
 	Harutyunyan Stanislav
 	Mirzoyan Artak
 	Mikaelyan Vladimir
 	Mikaelyan Arsen
 	Mkhitaryan Artush
 	Mnatsakanyan Serob
 	Narimanyan Kamo
 	Poghosyan Vahram
 	Hayrapetyan Susanna
 	Saryan Sumbat
 	Virabyan Michael
 	Ulubabyan Vardges
 	Qocharyan Kamo
 	Ohanyan Armen
 	Petrosyan Arthur
 	Hakobyan Anna
 	Ohanjanyan Ararat

See also

 List of political parties in Artsakh

References

External links
 Free Motherland Party on Facebook

Political parties in the Republic of Artsakh
Political parties established in 2005